The Florida Gators women's volleyball team represents the University of Florida in the sport of volleyball.  The Gators compete in Division I of the National Collegiate Athletics Association (NCAA) and the Southeastern Conference (SEC).  The Gators play their home matches in the O'Connell Center on the university's Gainesville, Florida campus, and are currently led by head coach Mary Wise.

History 

The University of Florida's athletic department, the University Athletic Association, authorized the first intercollegiate varsity women's volleyball team to begin play in the fall of 1984.  Marilyn McReavy was the Gators' first head coach, and she led the Gators volleyball team for seven seasons from 1984 to 1990.  McReavy's Gators compiled an overall win–loss record of 156–100 (.609), and a Southeastern Conference (SEC) record of 26–20 (.565).  Her best SEC finish was second place in 1988, and her 1987 team was the only one that qualified for the NCAA tournament.  McReavy resigned after a 15–16 performance in 1990.

Coach Mary Wise was hired to replace Marilyn McReavy in 1991.  In their first year under Wise, the Gators won the SEC regular season championship, sharing it with the LSU Tigers volleyball team.

In 1992, Florida made its first ever NCAA Final Four appearance, where they lost in the semifinals to eventual national runner-up UCLA 15–12, 15–12, 15–10.

In 1993, Wise became the first Division I female head coach to guide her team to more than one final four. In 1996, the Gators made their trip to their third final four in five years, losing to Hawaii in the semifinals. Wise was named the American Volleyball Coaches Association (AVCA) Division I National Coach of the Year.

In 1997, the Gators appeared in the final four once again, being swept by Penn State in the semifinals. The roster consisted of a young squad, only have three seniors on the team.

The Gators made their third consecutive final four in 1998, where they again lost in the semifinals, to eventual national champion and undefeated Long Beach State, 15–2, 15–8, 15–10.

In 2002, Florida made their first final four appearance since 1998, defeating Temple in the Sweet 16 and Penn State in the Elite Eight, before falling to eventual national champion Southern California in the semifinals.

After being 0-for-6 in previous NCAA Final Four semifinals, Florida broke through in 2003, by defeating Hawaii in the semis, 30–28, 30–28, 23–30, 30–28. Appearing in their first NCAA title match in school history, the Gators lost to undefeated Southern California in four sets, 25–30, 30–27, 30–19, 30–26. Wise became the first Division I female coach to coach in a championship match. In addition, Florida set a then-NCAA record of 105 straight games won during the 2003 season.

The Florida Gators opened the 2017 beating #1 Texas and #5 Nebraska in the opening weekend. They would eventually become the #1 ranked team...their first since 2010. The Gators finished the season 30-2 and reached their second final...falling to Nebraska 3–1. Rhamat Alhassan (1st Team), Carli Snyder (2nd Team), Shainah Joseph (2nd Team), and Rachael Kramer (3rd Team) would give Florida their highest total class of All-Americans in a single year in school history. Additionally, Mary Wise garnered the 2017 AVCA Coach of the Year for her third time....the second highest total in the award's history.

Year-by-year results

Southeastern Conference

Southeastern Conference Players of the Year

Florida has 12 players selected SEC player of the year for a total of 18 awards.

Gudula Staub, 1992
Aycan Gokberk, 1993, 1995
Jenny Wood, 1996
Nina Foster, 1997
Jenny Manz, 1998, 1999
Nicole McCray, 2000
Aury Cruz, 2001, 2002, 2003
Jane Collymore, 2004, 2005
Angie McGinnis, 2006, 2007
Kelly Murphy, 2010
Chloe Mann, 2012
Alex Holston, 2014
Rhamat Alhassan, 2017

Southeastern Conference Freshman of the Year
Florida has 5 recipients of the Freshman of the Year award.

Aury Cruz, 2000
Angie McGinnis, 2004
Kelly Murphy, 2008
Ziva Recek, 2012
Rhamat Alhassan, 2014

Southeastern Conference Libero of the Year
Florida has 1 recipient of the Libero of the Year award. The award for Libero of the Year began in 2009.

Taylor Unroe, 2013

Southeastern Conference Coach of the Year
Florida has 1 recipient of the Coach of the Year award for a total of 11 awards.

Mary Wise, 1995, 1996, 1998, 1999, 2000, 2001, 2002, 2007, 2010, 2012, 2014, 2017

Southeastern Conference Scholar Athlete of the Year
Florida has 3 recipients of the Scholar Athlete of the Year award. The award for Scholar Athlete of the Year began in 2003

Kelsey Bowers, 2008
Kristy Jaeckel, 2011
Holly Pole, 2014

Southeastern Conference Defensive Player of the Year
Florida has 1 recipient of the Defensive Player of the Year award. The award for Defensive Player of the Year began in 2003 and ended in 2008

Elyse Cusack, 2006

American Volleyball Coaches Association

All-Americans 

Florida has 32 AVCA All-America selections, tenth all-time in NCAA Division I, and 13 First Team selections, tied for tenth all-time.

Heidi Anderson, 1992
Rhamat Alhassan, 2015, 2017
Lauren Bledsoe, 2010
T'ara Ceasar, 2020
Jane Collymore, 2004, 2005
Aury Cruz, 2001, 2002, 2003
Erin Fleming, 2010
Lauren Forte, 2020
Nina Foster, 1997
Aycan Gokberk, 1993, 1995
Marcie Hampton, 2007
Benavia Jenkins, 2001, 2002, 2003
Shainah Joseph, 2017
Jenny Manz, 1998, 1999
Amber McCray, 2006
Nicole McCray, 2002
Angie McGinnis, 2005, 2006, 2007
Ashley Mullis, 1995
Kelly Murphy, 2008, 2009, 2010, 2011
Callie Rivers, 2010 
Aurymar Rodriguez, 1996
Jennifer Sanchez, 1998
Carli Snyder, 2017
Gudula Staub, 1991, 1992
Sherri Williams, 2003
Jenny Wood, 1996

National awards

Major awards 

Mary Wise, National Coach of the Year: 1992, 1996, 2017
Kelly Murphy, National Freshman of the Year: 2008
Ziva Recek, National Freshman of the Year: 2012

Player of the Week 

Nine players have earned twelve AVCA Division I National Player of the Week award:

Aycan Gokberk (Sept. 11, 1995 and Oct. 30, 1995)
Nina Foster (Sept. 1, 1997)
Jenny Manz (Sept. 7, 1998)
Heather Wright (Nov. 23, 1998)
Nicole McCray (Sept. 4, 2000)
Elyse Cusack (Nov. 6, 2006)
Kelly Murphy (Sept. 30, 2008; Aug. 21, 2010; and Sept. 20 2011)
Kristy Jaeckel (Oct. 4, 2011)
Rhamat Alhassan (Sept. 16, 2014)
Rachael Kramer (Aug. 29th, 2017)

See also 

 Florida Gators
 History of the University of Florida
 List of University of Florida Athletic Hall of Fame members
 List of University of Florida Olympians
 University Athletic Association
 List of NCAA Division I women's volleyball programs

References

External links
 

 
Volleyball clubs established in 1984
1984 establishments in Florida